A Voz do Carnaval (in English, literally The Carnival Voice) is a 1933 Brazilian short film documentary, directed by Adhemar Gonzaga and released by production company Cinédia. With no copies preserved, it is considered a lost film.

Production 
This semidocumentary was inspired by a story of Joracy Camargo and released on the eve of Rio Carnival. Using the Movietone sound system, it was the first Brazilian film to record optical sound directly from Rio streets. The documentary sequences filmed in the streets were interspersed with scenes filmed in the studio, showing comedian Palitos, in the role of King Momo. A sequence filmed in the studio of Radio Mayrink Veiga showed singer Carmen Miranda in her second film appearance, singing "E Bateu-se a Chapa", "Moleque Indigesto" and "Good-Bye".

A Voz do Carnaval was sponsored by the newspaper A Noite, and displayed simultaneously at Cine Odeon in Rio de Janeiro and Belo Horizonte on March 6, 1933. And in theaters Companhia Cine Brasil in Juiz de Fora through the Companhia Central Diversões. In Petrópolis in the Teatro Pedro II. A note published in the edition of the magazine Cinearte on June 15, 1933 said that the film was being displayed also in Porto Alegre.

Cast 
Carmen Miranda
Regina Mauro
Belmira de Almeida
Sônia Veiga
Sarah Nobre
Lu Marival
Irmãos Tapajós
Margarida Max
Lamartine Babo
Almirante
Jararaca & Ratinho
Jonjoca 
Castro Barbosa
Orquestra da Guarda Velha 
Henrique Chaves
Ferreira Maia 
Paulo Gonçalves 
Elza Moreno 
Paulina Mubarak 
Armando Louzada
Edmundo Maia

References 

1930s Portuguese-language films
1933 musical films
1933 documentary films
1933 films
Films shot in Brazil
Films set in Rio de Janeiro (city)
Films shot in Rio de Janeiro (city)
Brazilian musical films
Lost Brazilian films
Brazilian black-and-white films
Brazilian documentary films
1933 lost films
Lost musical films